Professor Tuen-Ho Yang (楊敦和; Hanyu pinyin: Yang Duenhe; 11 November 1941–) is a Taiwanese jurist and former president of Fu Jen Catholic University and St. John's University (Taiwan). Since 2014, he serves as a member of Chairman of the Board of Wenzao Ursuline University of Languages.

He was graduated from the College of Law and Business, National Chung Hsing University (present National Taipei University). He obtained a doctoral degree at the University of California, Berkeley.

References

External links
 輔大校史室：楊敦和

1947 births
Academic staff of Fu Jen Catholic University
National Taipei University alumni
Presidents of universities and colleges in Taiwan
Taiwanese educators
Living people